Isla Mujeres (Spanish for Island of the Women) is one of the eleven municipalities of the Mexican state of Quintana Roo, on the Yucatán Peninsula. Most of the municipality is located on the mainland in the northeastern corner of the state. It is the easternmost municipal seat in Mexico. In the  census, the town had a population of  inhabitants.

Towns and villages
The municipality consists of a total of 143 localities. The largest localities (cities, towns, and villages) are:

Demographics

References

External links

Official website

Municipalities of Quintana Roo